Bishops is an extinct genus of mammals from Early Cretaceous of Australia. The only recorded species, Bishops whitmorei, was found on Flat Rocks, Wonthaggi Formation, Victoria. The genus was named in honour of Dr Barry Bishop, the former Chairman of the Committee for Research and Exploration, National Geographic Society.

References

Further reading
 Rich, T. H.; Flannery, T. F.; Trusler, P.; Kool, L.; van Klaveren, N. A. & Vickers-Rich, P. 2001. "A second tribosphenic mammal from the Mesozoic of Australia." Records of the Queen Victoria Museum 110: 1–9.

Cretaceous mammals of Australia
Australosphenida
Extinct mammals of Australia